Slow Death is the sixth studio album by American deathcore band Carnifex. It was released on August 5, 2016 through Nuclear Blast and was produced by Jason Suecof.

Background and recording
On November 3, 2014, Carnifex announced that they are working on new material for the forthcoming album. On September 3, 2015, vocalist Scott Lewis stated during an interview that the band will be releasing their new album in the summer of 2016. On January 14, 2016, the group announced that the album is in pre-production.

On February 16, Carnifex begun recording the new album. On February 29, a tease of a new song the band have in the works for their album was posted through their social media accounts. On April 15, the band would be filming a music video for a track from the album and were looking for fans to take part in the shoot, which took place in Los Angeles on April 24. On May 11, they revealed the album itself, the album cover, the track list, and release date.

Critical reception

The album received positive reviews from critics. Jessica Howkins of Distorted Sound scored the album 9 out of 10 and said: "Deathcore is a falling genre, many are forgetting its existence whilst others are moving on, but it is bands like Carnifex when they release titans such as Slow Death that keep it alive. The album is stunning from start to finish, and everything that the band wanted to achieve, they have done and more. Slow Death is without a doubt, the deathcore album of 2016." KillYourStereo gave the album a positive review and stated: "While I can recommend Slow Death, I feel as though the very expectations and hype set by Carnifex hasn't come to full fruition." Louder Sound gave the album a positive review and stated: It has to be said, though, that Carnifex still aren't breaking any new musical ground with Slow Death, but one thing's for sure – you just can't argue with the quality and effectiveness what's on offer."

Metal Injection rated the album 8.5 out of 10 and stated, "Slow Death is a solid, atmospheric, and a most of all HEAVY release. If you have been lacking in new material to headbang to, then this is the perfect medicine for you. If you're still in the anti-deathcore camp, then this still might not do it for you, but perhaps you could try and be pleasantly surprised." Ali Cooper of Rock Sins rated the album 8 out of 10 and said: "Slow Death is no calculating innovation or threatening game changer, simply a self-assured proof of Carnifex's magnetic presence. Simultaneously accessible and destructive, the omnipresent atmospherics throughout save this from becoming another eventless deathcore addition." Wall of Sound gave the album a score 7/10 and saying: "Slow Death is anything but it's namesake. It's a free falling descent into the pits of hell, a journey that not only destroys your neck but annihilates your throat. Carnifex are the premier band in this scene and Slow Death is ten reasons why."

Track listing
Adapted from Apple Music.

Personnel
Credits adapted from AllMusic.

Carnifex
 Scott Lewis – lead vocals
 Jordan Lockrey – lead guitar
 Cory Arford – rhythm guitar, backing vocals
 Fred Calderon – bass
 Shawn Cameron – drums, keyboards

Additional musicians
 Sims Cashion – additional guitar

Additional personnel
 Jason Suecof – production, engineering
 Carnifex – arranging
 Mick Kenney – arranging
 Matt Brown – drum technician
 John Douglass – engineering
 Ronn Miller – assistant engineering
 Mark Lewis – mixing, mastering
 Marcelo Vasco – layout
 Clayton Addison – photography

References

2016 albums
Carnifex (band) albums
Nuclear Blast albums